The Japanese women's chess championship has been largely dominated by Naoko Takemoto (Naoko Takahashi before she married).

Winners
{| class="sortable wikitable"
! NO. !! Held in !! Men's Winner !! Women's Winner
|-
|	1	|| 1968	|| Yukio Miyasaka	||
|-
|	2	|| 1969	|| Yukio Miyasaka	||
|-
|	3	|| 1970	|| Yukio Miyasaka	||
|-
|	4	|| 1971	|| Yukio Miyasaka	||
|-
|	5	|| 1972	|| Gentaro Gonda	||
|-
|	6	|| 1973	|| Gentaro Gonda	||
|-
|	7	|| 1974	|| Ken Hamada  || Miyoko Watai
|-
|	8	|| 1975	|| Gentaro Gonda	|| Emiko Nakagawa
|-
|	9	|| 1976	|| Gentaro Gonda	|| Emiko Nakagawa
|-
|	10	|| 1977	|| Gentaro Gonda	||  Miyoko Watai
|-
|	11	|| 1978	|| Gentaro Gonda	|| Miyoko Watai
|-
|	12	|| 1979	|| Gentaro Gonda	|| Naoko Takemoto
|-
|	13	|| 1980	|| Koobun Oda	|| Naoko Takemoto
|-
|	14	|| 1981	|| Koobun Oda || Naoko Takemoto
|-
|	15	|| 1982	|| Hiroyuki Nishimura || Naoko Takemoto
|-
|	16	|| 1983	|| Hiroyuki Nishimura	|| Naoko Takemoto
|-
|	17	|| 1984	|| Hiroyuki Nishimura	|| Naoko Takemoto
|-
|	18	|| 1985	|| Gentaro Gonda Paul Kuroda	||Naoko Takemoto
|-
|	19	|| 1986	|| Jacques Pineau || Naoko Takemoto
|-
|	20	|| 1987	|| Tomomichi Suzuki || Naoko Takemoto
|-
|	21	|| 1988	|| Loren Schmidt || Naoko Takemoto
|-
|	22	|| 1989	|| Gentaro Gonda	|| Naoko Takemoto
|-
|	23	|| 1990	|| Joselito Sunga || Naoko Takemoto
|-
|	24	|| 1991	|| Mats Andersson	|| Naoko Takemoto
|-
|	25	|| 1992	|| Domingo Ramos || Naoko Takemoto
|-
|	26	|| 1993	|| Jacques Pineau	|| Naoko Takemoto
|-
|	27	|| 1994	|| Hiroyuki Nishimura || Naoko Takemoto
|-
|	28	|| 1995	|| Domingo Ramos  Tomohiko Matsuo || not played
|-
|	29	|| 1996	|| Gentaro Gonda	|| not played
|-
|	30	|| 1997	|| Gentaro Gonda	|| not played
|-
|	31	|| 1998	|| Akira Watanabe	|| not played
|-
|	32	|| 1999	|| Akira Watanabe	|| not played
|-
|	33	|| 2000	|| Akira Watanabe	|| not played
|-
|	34	|| 2001	|| Gentaro Gonda	|| Miyoko Watai   Nguyen Khanh Ngoc
|-
|	35	|| 2002	|| Simon Bibby || not played
|-
|	36	|| 2003	|| Ryo Shiomi   Kiyotaka Sakai || Emiko Nakagawa
|-
|	37	|| 2004	|| Kiyotaka Sakai	|| Melody Garcia
|-
|	38	|| 2005	|| Shinya Kojima || Haruko Tanaka
|-
|	39	|| 2006	|| Shinya Kojima   Masahiro Baba || Emiko Nakagawa
|-
|	40	|| 2007	|| Shinsaku Uesugi  Shinya Kojima || Emiko Nakagawa
|- 
|	41	|| 2008	|| Shinya Kojima || Emiko Nakagawa
|-
|	42	|| 2009	|| Sam Collins || Narumi Uchida
|-
|	43	|| 2010	|| Ryosuke Nanjo  Shinya Kojima || Narumi Uchida
|-
|44
|2011
|Ryuji Nakamura Masahiro Baba||Ekaterina Egorova
|-
|45
|2012
|Ryosuke Nanjo
|
|-
|46
|2013
|Junta Ikeda||Narumi Uchida
|-
|47
|2014
|Ryosuke Nanjo||Narumi Uchida
|-
|48
|2015
|Masahiro Baba||Mirai Ishizuka
|-
|49
|2016
|Tran Thanh Tu || Mirai Ishizuka
|-
|50
|2017
| Koji Noguchi || Karen Hoshino
|-
|51
|2018
|Tran Thanh Tu || Qin Ranran
|-
|52
|2019
|Aoshima Mirai|| 
|-
|53
|2020
|Tran Thanh Tu || not played
|-
|54
|2021
| not played || not played
|-
|55
|2022
|Aoshima Mirai|| Sakai Azumi
|-
|}

References
 Results from the Japanese Chess Federation   (in Japanese)
 Short biography on Akira Wanatabe 
 Chess in Japan 
 On Shinya Kojima's 2006 and 2007 victory  (in German)
 On the 2008 edition 
 On the women's editions: 2002 , 2004 , 2005 , 2006 , 2007  (in Japanese)
 On the men's editions: 2004 , 2005 , 2006 , 2007 , 2008  (in Japanese)

Chess national championships
Women's chess national championships
Championship
1969 in chess
1975 in chess
1969 establishments in Japan
Recurring sporting events established in 1969
National championships in Japan